The Warrington and Newton Railway was a short early railway linking Warrington to the Liverpool and Manchester Railway at Newton, and to pits at Haydock, nearby. It opened in 1831.

The Grand Junction Railway aspired to make its long-distance route from Birmingham to Liverpool and Manchester, and acquire the W&NR so as to use it from Warrington northwards. The permanent way needed to be strengthened for main line use. The GJR opened its line in 1837, connecting at Warrington to the W&NR and gaining access to Liverpool and Manchester over the L&MR. The W&NR was the first part of the present-day West Coast Main Line to be opened.

Branch from the Liverpool and Manchester Railway
On 15 September 1830 the Liverpool and Manchester Railway opened for business. Although this was a purely west to east line, primarily connecting the manufactories of Manchester with the great docks of Liverpool, there were already thoughts of forming a British railway network.

While the L&MR was still being built, a company to make a branch line from it to Warrington was being proposed, and the Warrington and Newton Railway was authorised by Parliament on 14 May 1829. It was to run from a terminal at Dallum Lane in Warrington, to Newton (later Newton-le-Willows) on the L&MR, a distance of a little over 4 miles. There was to be a branch at Warrington to Bank Quay, close to the River Mersey, and a northward extension at Newton to coal pits at Haydock. Authorised share capital was £53,000. The junction at Newton was to face towards Liverpool. Warrington was a manufacturing town with a population of about 19,000. One of the main objects was the quick conveyance of coal from the Haydock pits near Newton to Warrington.

There was a lack of unity on the board over the construction, which delayed construction, and powerful landowners on the intended route of the line also made difficulties. The type of track adopted had cast iron fishbellied rails and untreated larch sleepers; the failure to apply preservative treatment resulted in early failure of the sleepers.

The Liverpool-facing connection at Newton was seen to be a limitation, and in 1830, a second Act was secured, authorising a curve at Newton to connect to the L&MR in the Manchester direction, and also to make a direct connection to the Wigan Branch Railway, which ran north from a junction at Parkside, which faced Manchester. In fact both the Warrington and Newton Railway and the Wigan Branch Railway found themselves short of funds and they were unable to build the connecting lines and spur.

Opening
The Warrington and Newton Railway opened between Warrington (Dallam) and a location at Newton, terminating at a point south of the L&MR junction, at the beginning of June 1831. This was for the Haydock Park races, and passenger trains ran regularly after that. The Newton curve and connection to the L&MR was completed on 25 July 1831. There were four trains each way Monday to Saturday only, although Sunday trains were put on by 1833. The trains were worked by three locomotives, named Warrington, Newton and Vulcan.

The Bank Quay branch was not completed at first, and it was probably opened about 1835, diverging from the Dallam line at Jockey Lane. Until 1837 it was used for goods and mineral traffic only; it was close to the River Mersey where shipping could berth.

Grand Junction Railway
In 1832 and 1833 the promoters of the Grand Junction Railway were considering their options. They wished to build a trunk railway connecting Birmingham with Liverpool and Manchester. If Liverpool was to be connected to the network further south, then the River Mersey would need to be crossed: the Warrington & Newton Railway could serve as the northern extremity if a crossing of the Mersey in Warrington were made. The proposed Grand Junction Railway would link Birmingham with the central point of the Liverpool and Manchester Railway at Newton Junction, and Liverpool and Manchester would thereby be joined with Birmingham. This compromise lengthened the distance by rail between Birmingham and the two Lancashire towns, but the greater convenience and economy was decisive, and the necessary authorising Act was secured on 6 May 1833.

The directors of the W&NR saw that their railway was important for the Grand Junction Railway and by the end of 1833 they were demanding £125 for each £100 of stock as well as settlement of their debts of about £20,000. Negotiation reduced this to £114 6s a share, but the GJR directors expressed themselves disappointed at this unexpected difficulty. They now considered an alternative route, by-passing the W&NR to the west. Webster says that three inclined planes (on the W&NR) would be avoided by this means. In fact these "inclined planes" were not so steep as some: in describing the Grand Junction route, Whishaw says "In the ascending planes are included only two which have gradients under the first class [steeper gradients]; these are at Burton Wood and Newton Brook, both lying between Warrington and Newton; the former being 21 chains in length, and inclining at the rate of 1 in 209; and the latter having an inclination of 1 in 85, and extending for one mile."

In February 1835 the W&NR agreed to sell their line for shares at par, with the GJR adopting their outstanding debt of about £22,000. The GJR undertook to pay the W&NR shareholders 4 per cent until their main line was open throughout: the purchase price was around £67,000, and the takeover was authorised by Act of 12 June 1835, effective from 1 January 1835. The GJR knew it would have to upgrade the permanent way on the W&NR for stronger materials appropriate for a main line railway.

The Grand Junction Railway opened their line from Newton Junction to a temporary Birmingham station at Vauxhall on 4 July 1837. When the Grand Junction Railway line was completed to Warrington on 4 July 1837, the connection was made at Bank Quay and through trains used a station there. Dallam station was relegated to local passenger and goods use at that time.

Connections at Newton
The Newton Junction faced Liverpool, and the Parkside Junction of the Wigan Branch Railway faced away, towards Manchester, so that when through running between those lines was started, two reversals were necessary. On 4 July 1837 an east curve at Newton was opened; this was also the date on which the Grand Junction made a connection with the Warrington and Newton; direct running towards Manchester was now possible. Reed says that portion working was adopted, with northbound passenger trains dividing at Newton, and portions continuing to Liverpool and Manchester respectively, but Holt and Biddle say that "Trains to Liverpool and Manchester did not divide at Newton, but ran independently between Warrington and the L&MR." The Newton East Curve was exceptionally sharp, and Reed attributes this to the fact that building it like that obviated the necessity of a further Act of Parliament, by avoiding a land take.

Use of the Newton curves for main-line trains to and from the south continued for Manchester trains until the opening throughout on 10 August 1842, of the Manchester to Crewe line of the Manchester and Birmingham Railway. For Liverpool trains the usage continued until the opening in April 1869 of the Runcorn Railway Bridge and the Runcorn to Weaver Junction line.

The direct connection between the Warrington and Wigan lines, from what became Winwick junction to Golborne junction was first planned in 1830, but not built then for lack of money. The Grand Junction Railway managed to renew the authorisation, but again was unable to carry out the work. A third authorisation was granted on 11 July 1861 to the London and North Western Railway, and it was opened on 1 August 1864, under powers granted a third time, in 1861. Neele records that its first mention in LNWR passenger timetables was not until February 1872. Night postal trains continued to use the original route as Newton had become an established exchange point for mails.

West Coast Main Line
The Warrington and Newton Railway was the first "modern" railway element of the present-day West Coast Main Line, from London to Glasgow. The other sections were the London and Birmingham Railway, 1837–1838, the Trent Valley Railway, 1847, the Grand Junction Railway, 1837, Winwick Jn to Golborne Jn, LNWR 1864, the Wigan branch Railway, 1832, the North Union Railway, 1838, the Lancaster and Preston Junction Railway, 1840, the Lancaster and Carlisle Railway, 1846, the Caledonian Railway, 1847–1848, the Wishaw and Coltness Railway, 1841, the Caledonian Railway, 1849, the Polloc and Govan Railway, 1840, and the Caledonian Railway, 1879.

The former W&NR line remains in use at the present day from Bank Quay station to Newton. The West Coast Main Line diverges at Winwick Junction to take the 1867 curve. The original southern section to Dallam has closed. The Three Pigeons public house, (still extant in 2020) is adjacent to the location of the Dallam terminal. Reed says that "It has been surmised that the Three Pigeons, erected as a public house shortly before the railway, may have served by the good offices of the then landlord, as a booking office for the W. &. N. This seems unlikely; it is at the outer end of the whole station area, and with Warrington as it was in 1831–37 most passengers would come in at the town end from Bewsey Lane and Foundry Lane, and not along Tanner's Lane; and the station building would be of ample size to provide booking accommodation and a waiting room."

Notes

References

See also

Grand Junction Railway
Early British railway companies
Railway companies established in 1829
Railway lines opened in 1831
Railway companies disestablished in 1835
British companies established in 1829
British companies disestablished in 1835